Kyle Hayton is an American former ice hockey goaltender. He was an All-American for St. Lawrence.

Playing career
Hayton began attending St. Lawrence University in 2014 and was an instant hit for the Saints. He backstopped the team to its first 20-win season in six years and finished the year with some of the best numbers in the nation. He was named as the ECAC Hockey Rookie of the Year and there was hope that he would soon end the team's 8-year NCAA Tournament drought. Hayton's second season was a near-carbon copy of his freshman campaign, but that still left the team outside of the national tournament. After that season, head coach Greg Carvel left and was replaced by Mark Morris. Despite posting his worst statistical numbers to that point, Hayton was named to the All-American team as a junior but there were problems brewing behind the scenes. Many of the Saints' players were not happy with how Morris was running the team and the program began to hemorrhage talent.

During his third year, Hayton was able to earn enough credits to graduate a year early. He used his status to transfer to Wisconsin without having to sit out for a year (a then-NCAA requirement). Unfortunately, Hayton joined the Badgers just when the team was tumbling down the standings and he couldn't help them finish better than 6th in the Big Ten.

Hayton Began playing professionally the following season, spending time with three separate ECHL teams. The results were underwhelming, but Hayton resigned with the Greenville Swamp Rabbits in August for his second pro campaign. Less than two months later, however, Hayton decided to hang up his pads and ended his playing career.

After hockey, he worked as a financial representative for Northwestern Mutual before taking a position as a Trainee Appraiser for Integra Realty Resources (as of 2021).

Career statistics

Awards and honors

References

External links

1994 births
Living people
American men's ice hockey goaltenders
Ice hockey people from Denver
AHCA Division I men's ice hockey All-Americans
St. Lawrence Saints men's ice hockey players
Wisconsin Badgers men's ice hockey players
Fort Wayne Komets players
Allen Americans players
Greenville Swamp Rabbits players